Clayton James Thorson (born June 15, 1995) is an American football quarterback who is currently a free agent. He was drafted by the Philadelphia Eagles in the fifth round of the 2019 NFL Draft. He played college football at Northwestern.

Early years
Thorson attended Wheaton North High School in Wheaton, Illinois. As a senior, he had 2,809 passing yards, 29 passing touchdowns, 630 rushing yards and 12 rushing touchdowns. He received all-area, all-conference and all-state honors. 

In the playoffs against Fenwick High School, he guided his team to a 32-31 win, after coming back from a 6-31 second-quarter deficit, by tallying 413 passing yards and 5 touchdowns. He led his team to back-to-back state quarterfinals in his last two years. He was named MVP in Semper Fidelis All-American Bowl.

College career
Thorson accepted a football scholarship from Northwestern University. As a redshirt freshman in 2015, he took over the starting quarterback job that was left open after Trevor Siemian graduated. He completed 150 of 295 passes for 1,522 passing yards, 7 touchdowns, 9 interceptions, 397 rushing yards and 5 touchdowns. He became the first quarterback in school history to have 10 wins as a freshman and in his first season as a starter.

As a sophomore in 2016, the team lost its first two games against Western Michigan University and Illinois State University. He completed 280-of-478 passes for 3,182 yards (school record for sophomores), 22 passing touchdowns (school record), 5 rushing touchdowns (second on the team) and 5 interceptions. He had career-high 352 passing yards and 3 passing touchdowns in a 45-17 win against Purdue University.

As a junior in 2017, he posted 2,844 passing yards, 15 touchdowns, 8 rushing touchdowns (second on the team) and 12 interceptions. He tore his right ACL in the 2017 Music City Bowl against the University of Kentucky, while making a reception on a trick play.

As a senior in 2018, he was limited by his previous right knee injury, coming back with less than 8 months of recovery. On November 10, Thorson led the Cats to a 14-10 victory over the No. 21 ranked University of Iowa, earning Northwestern the 2018 Big Ten West title. He finished with 3,183 passing yards, 17 passing touchdowns, 15 interceptions and 9 rushing touchdowns (led the team).

His 53 consecutive starts at quarterback is the most ever in the Big Ten and tied for the most with Colt McCoy in all of the Power Five conferences, and over those 4 years Clayton set several Northwestern career records including wins (35), passing yards (10,731), completions (991) and passing touchdowns (61). He's the only quarterback in Big Ten history to pass for 10,000 yards and rush for 20 touchdowns in his career.

College statistics

Professional career

Philadelphia Eagles
Thorson was selected by the Philadelphia Eagles in the fifth round (167th overall) of the 2019 NFL Draft. He was waived during final roster cuts on August 31, 2019.

Dallas Cowboys
On September 1, 2019, Thorson was signed to the Dallas Cowboys practice squad. He signed a reserve/future contract with the Cowboys on December 31, 2019. He was waived on September 2, 2020.

New York Giants
On September 29, 2020, Thorson was signed to the New York Giants' practice squad. The signing reunited him with offensive coordinator Jason Garrett, who was his head coach with the Cowboys. He was elevated to the active roster on December 5 and 19 for the team's weeks 13 and 15 games against the Seattle Seahawks and Cleveland Browns, and reverted to the practice squad after each game. He signed a reserve/future contract on January 4, 2021.

On August 16, 2021, Thorson was waived/injured by the Giants and placed on injured reserve. He was released on August 25. On December 7, 2021, Thorson signed to the Giants practice squad  and was released on December 14. On January 8, 2022, Thorson was signed back to the practice squad.  His contract expired when the team's season ended on January 9, 2022.

Houston Gamblers
On February 22, 2022, Thorson was selected by the Houston Gamblers in the 2022 USFL Draft. He was named the team's starting quarterback, even though he showed inconsistent play in the first two contests, while throwing 4 interceptions. On June 2, he was transferred to the inactive/injured reserve roster with an elbow injury. He started in the first seven games of the season, completing 57% of his passes for 987 yards, 10 passing touchdowns, 71 rushing yards, one rushing touchdown and 7 interceptions. At the time of his injury, he was the league's leader in passing touchdowns. He was replaced with Kenji Bahar. On January 5, 2023, Thorson was released by the Gamblers.

Statistics

Personal life 
Thorson and his wife, Audrey, have been married since June 2018.

References

External links

Northwestern Wildcats bio

1995 births
Living people
Sportspeople from Wheaton, Illinois
Players of American football from Illinois
American football quarterbacks
Northwestern Wildcats football players
Philadelphia Eagles players
Dallas Cowboys players
New York Giants players
Houston Gamblers (2022) players